Results from the 2014–15 Cayman Islands FA Cup

Schedule

First round 

 Sunset          0-2 Cayman Brac     
 Future          0-1 Academy         
[Mar 8]
 George Town     3-1 East End        
[Mar 10]
 Scholars        1-2 Bodden Town     
[Mar 11]
 Elite          11-2 Savannah Tigers 
 Latinos         4-6 Cayman Athletic 
 Roma United     bye North Side

Quarterfinals

Semifinals

Final

References 
 RSSSF

2014–15 in Caymanian football